Martha S. Hennessey (born February 2, 1954) is an American politician who served in the New Hampshire Senate for the 5th district from 2016 until 2020. She was the chair of the Senate Judiciary Committee, and served on Transportation and Health and Human Services Committees. She previously served on the Children and Family Law Committee in the New Hampshire House of Representatives for the Grafton 12 district from 2014 to 2016.

Hennessey graduated from Dartmouth College (1976), with a degree in psychology and from the University of Pennsylvania, with an MBA (Wharton) and PhD in developmental psychology. She practiced as an educational psychologist in Massachusetts and New Hampshire, before joining the NH legislature. She is married to Stephen Severson, and they have three children (Kristina, Tucker, and Elizabeth) and 6 granddaughters.

References

1953 births
Living people
Democratic Party members of the New Hampshire House of Representatives
Democratic Party New Hampshire state senators
Women state legislators in New Hampshire
21st-century American politicians
21st-century American women politicians
Politicians from Seattle